Morano Calabro is a town and comune in the province of Cosenza in the Calabria region of southern Italy. It was  the birthplace of mathematician Gaetano Scorza.

Geography
The municipality borders with Castrovillari (the nearest town), Mormanno, Rotonda, San Basile, Saracena, Terranova di Pollino and Viggianello.

Campotenese
Its frazione (civil parish), the village of Campotenese, is located on a mountain pass at 1,015 amsl. A tourist site, the village is best known for the Battle of Campo Tenese (1806) between the First French Empire and the Kingdom of Naples.

Sister cities
  Porto Alegre, Brazil

See also
Battle of Campo Tenese

References

External links

Official website 

Cities and towns in Calabria